The cinnamon-chested flycatcher (Ficedula buruensis) is a species of bird in the family Muscicapidae.
It is found in Buru, Seram, and Kai Besar.

Its natural habitat is subtropical or tropical moist montane forests.

References

cinnamon-chested flycatcher
Birds of Buru
Birds of Seram
Birds of the Kai Islands
cinnamon-chested flycatcher
Taxonomy articles created by Polbot